Ballykeeran, is a small village in County Westmeath, Ireland, near Glassan. It is located on the N55 road in the townland of Annagh overlooking Lough Ree.

Features
There are tourist accommodations, a caravan park, and a local pub.
There is also an old mill that sits on the Breensford River that runs through the village.
At one stage in history this was used as an RIC Barracks.

See also
 List of towns and villages in Ireland

References

Towns and villages in County Westmeath